Intellectual property (IP) refers to creations of the mind, such as inventions; literary and artistic works; designs; and symbols, names and images used in commerce.

IP is protected in law by, for example, patents, copyright and trademarks, which enable people to earn recognition or financial benefit from what they invent or create. By striking the right balance between the interests of innovators and the wider public interest, the IP system aims to foster an environment in which creativity and innovation can flourish.

Types of intellectual property typically include: 
 Copyright
 Patents
 Trademarks
 Industrial designs
 Geographical indications

In today's highly competitive consumer electronics industry, given the nature of the products and the quality of the market, Patents and Industrial designs are arguably becoming the most concerned types of intellectual property.

The necessity of protecting intellectual property in consumer electronics industry 
First, patents and industrial designs have a strong presence in the consumer electronics industry. As evidenced by the steady stream of novel high-tech offerings and the rate at which the latest gadgets become ‘‘obsolete,’’ companies in the electrical industry invest millions in research and development to meet the immense demand for new, useful technologies, and to help bring to market the next wave of cutting-edge products for consumers. The fruits of this research and development - which gives rise to the technologies themselves or to a key component of a particular products’ functionality - are typically protected through patents.

Second, the consequence of leaking patents and industrial designs could be devastating. One of the examples is the series of ongoing lawsuits between Apple and Samsung regarding the design of smartphones and tablet computers.

Practice in developing a company’s IP protection measures 
On strategic level, a common practice is to develop an effective IP protection strategy. The following steps is commonly used in establishing such strategy:
 the first step is to identify the corporate strategy and determine the best means for aligning the corporate strategy with the IP strategy
 in order to properly identify IP assets, it is critical that a thorough IP audit be performed by personnel within the corporation who are knowledgeable or familiar with the company's IP or the company's technology plan.
 determining whether the identified IP assets are core assets
 properly allocating corporate resources to core and non-core IP assets
 setting up a program for periodic review of IP assets
On operational level, and given that the development phase usually involves developing various prototypes and blueprints and sometimes have to work with third-party vendors under circumstances, establishing a secrecy program throughout the whole project team would be beneficial in mitigating the leak risk. The following is a list of key questions need to be asked in the development phase of such secrecy program.
 Identify the external and internal parties and understand the roles and responsibilities
 Consider legal options on the table prior to engaging. For internal team/staff, NDA is the minimum requirement. For external party, master service agreement (MSA) along with vendor obligation and penalty clauses is a favorable option.
 Enforcing ongoing secrecy protection program. The elements that could put into the program include the statement of security responsibilities for vendors, the right to perform IP compliance and security compliance vendor assessment at the company's discretion.
 Establishing Information security requirements.
 Conduct IP protection and secrecy awareness training to all required person.
 Determine leak investigation capacity

References 

Intellectual property law
Consumer electronics